The Texas Board of Legal Specialization (TBLS) was established on July 16, 1974, by the State Bar of Texas. TBLS oversees the recognition and regulation of attorneys who specialize in particular areas of law in the state of Texas. Today, the organization certifies attorneys in 24 different specialty areas and paralegals in six specialty areas.

Purpose
The TBLS' purpose is to advance the standards of the legal profession and support the availability, accessibility and quality of services provided by Texas attorneys to the public in selected areas of law.

Governance
The TBLS is overseen by twelve members who are appointed by the President of the State Bar of Texas and approved by its Board of Directors.  It has authority over all matters relating legal specialization in Texas and is subject to ongoing jurisdiction by the Supreme Court of Texas.

Specialty areas
The Texas Board of Legal Specialization certifies attorneys in the following selected areas of Texas law:
Administrative
Bankruptcy – Business and Consumer
Civil Appellate
Civil Trial
Consumer and Commercial
Criminal
Estate Planning and Probate
Family
Health
Immigration and Nationality
Juvenile
Labor and Employment
Oil, Gas and Mineral
Personal Injury Trial
Real Estate – Commercial, Farm & Ranch, Property Owners Association, Residential
Tax
Workers' Compensation
Criminal Appellate
Child Welfare
Construction

See also
State Bar of Texas
American Bar Association
Texas Supreme Court
Professional certification
National Board of Legal Specialty Certification
Attorneys in the United States

References

External links
 Texas Board of Legal Specialization
 State Bar of Texas
 Supreme Court of Texas

Texas law
Organizations established in 1974
American state bar associations
Organizations based in Texas
1974 establishments in Texas